Abru (also Romanized as Ābrū and Āb Row; also known as Abrao) is a village in Talkhvoncheh Rural District, in the Central District of Mobarakeh County, Isfahan Province, Iran. At the 2006 census, its population was 329, in 77 families.

References 

Populated places in Mobarakeh County